, formerly the , is an automated guideway transit service operated by Yurikamome, Inc., connecting Shimbashi to Toyosu, via the artificial island of Odaiba in Tokyo, Japan, a market in which it competes with the Rinkai Line.

The line is named after the black-headed gull (yurikamome in Japanese), a common denizen of Tokyo Bay and the official metropolitan bird.

History
Before its 1995 opening, it was widely feared that the Yurikamome would end up as a multibillion-yen white elephant. The artificial island of Odaiba, which it serves, had been designed and constructed at prodigious expense before Japan's economic crash and, much like London's equally beleaguered Canary Wharf, there simply did not seem to be enough demand to support it. In the first few months of operation, ridership hovered around 27,000 passengers per day, only a little less than the predicted 29,000, but still far less than the 80,000 passengers needed to be profitable.

However, in 1996, the Tokyo Metropolitan Government re-zoned Odaiba from pure business and residential to also permit entertainment zones. The island provided Tokyo with a strip of livable seaside, and within one year, ridership doubled to 60,000. As more and more restaurants, shopping malls, exhibition centers and museums opened, traffic continued to grow.

It is not just the island that became popular, as the Yurikamome had become an attraction in itself. To raise itself from ground level to the Rainbow Bridge, the Yurikamome makes a 270-degree loop, providing panoramic views of both mainland Tokyo and Odaiba.

 1 November 1995: Shimbashi-Ariake opens, using temporary Shimbashi station
 22 March 2001: Current Shimbashi station opens, temporary station closes
 2 November 2002: Shiodome Station opens
 27 March 2006: Ariake-Toyosu opens; all stations adopt letter/number identification based on Tokyo Metro.
 16 March 2019: Renamed 2 stations; Fune-no-kagakukan → Tokyo International Cruise Terminal, Kokusai-tenjijō-seimon → Tokyo Big Sight

An accident on the Yurikamome occurred on the afternoon of 14 April 2006. According to a government commission, one of the axles on the six-car train was cracked due to metal fatigue, causing a rubber tire on the train to fall off. The train came to a halt near Fune-no-kagakukan station, and services were suspended on the entire line. This came at the start of a busy weekend when events were taking place at Tokyo Big Sight on Odaiba, but, according to news reports, alternate means of transportation were offered and there was no major confusion. The Yurikamome resumed limited train service on April 17 while further inspections and tests continued, with full service restored on 19 April.

Future plans
At over 160,000 passengers per day, the Yurikamome is making a net profit and will pay off its loans in full faster than the 20 years originally anticipated. Operating frequency, hours of operation and number of trainsets have been continually revised upwards to accommodate the ever-increasing number of passengers.

The extension has become more likely as part of infrastructure improvements for the 2020 Summer Olympics, which will largely be held within the Yurikamome corridor around Toyosu, Ariake and Odaiba, with six competition venues along its route.

Technology

The Yurikamome is Tokyo's first fully automated transit system, controlled entirely by computers with no drivers on board. However, the line is not the first in Japan, as Kobe's Port Liner opened in 1981, 14 years before the Yurikamome.

The Yurikamome is sometimes mistakenly called a monorail, but the trains run with rubber-tired wheels on elevated concrete track guided by the side walls.

Stations
Since 2006, all the stations use the recorded voices of different voice actors for their Japanese-language announcements. The letter "U" is used as the symbol for station numbers rather than "Y" for Yurikamome as this letter is already used as the acronym for the Tokyo Metro Yurakucho Line.

Yurikamome trains are taken in and out of service at Ariake, and are stored in a yard near Tokyo Big Sight when not in service.

Ridership 

Ridership on the line peaked at over 200,000 daily boardings in 2000, but declined substantially by 2004 as the Rinkai Line, which opened a year after the Yurikamome Line, expanded into more of the waterfront area and offered lower fares. Between 2004 and 2006, four new stations were added, which raised ridership slightly.

Rolling stock
The line uses Mitsubishi Heavy Industries rubber-tired "Crystal Mover" technology. , the following train types are used on the line, all formed as six-car sets.
 7000 series
 7200 series 
 7300 series
 7500 series

Between 2014 and 2016, a fleet of 18 new six-car 7300 series trains are being introduced on the line. The first train was test run during the summer of 2013, entering revenue service from 18 January 2014. The new trains have longitudinal seating throughout, to increase overall capacity and speed-up boarding and alighting. Between June 2018 and June 2020, eight more six-car trainsets will be built for the line by Mitsubishi Heavy Industries to replace the fleet of 7200 series trains.

7000 series

, four out of the original 18 7000 series sets (05, 16, 17, and 18) were still in service, formed as six-car sets as follows.

("xx" stands for the unit number.)

7200 series

, eight 7200 series sets (21 to 28) were in service, formed as six-car sets as follows.

("xx" stands for the unit number.)

7300 series

, 16 7300 series sets (31 to 46) were in service, formed as six-car sets as follows.

("xx" stands for the unit number.)

7500 series

, one 7500 series set (51) were in service, formed as six-car sets as below. In November 2020, delivery of the eight six-car sets was completed.

("xx" stands for the unit number.)

In fiction 

The line is featured in the anime Love Live! Nijigasaki High School Idol Club from the Love Live! franchise, with a fictional station bearing the school's name from the show.

See also
 List of tram and light-rail transit systems

References

External links

 
 Japan Rail and Transport Review article

 
People mover systems in Japan
Railway lines opened in 1995
1995 establishments in Japan